The Jaguar XF (X260) is an executive/mid-size luxury sports saloon manufactured and marketed by the Jaguar Cars brand of Jaguar Land Rover in sedan/saloon and station wagon/estate body styles. Following the first generation steel-bodied X250 XF introduced in 2007, the second-generation XF sedan/saloon debuted at the 2015 New York International Auto Show, noted for its aluminium bodywork.

As of 2022, the XF has been downgraded to compete in the D-segment while retaining its E-segment exterior dimensions.

Overview

The XF is an evolution of the original J-Blade design pioneered in the X250 XF, with a largely similar silhouette. Effort was made to build a uniform design language across Jaguar's saloon range.

The X260 XF uses 83 percent all-new parts compared with the previous model. The car is  shorter than the predecessor. Bodywork uses aluminium as the primary component of the body structure and chassis; the XF's bodyside panel is a single aluminium pressing.

The chassis featured a fully independent suspension, including multiple "modes" in the S model providing either maximum comfort, maximum performance, or a setting in between.  The standard model in the USA featured a P250 247 HP Ingenium engine.  Optional power included the P300 296 HP turbo 4 and the P380 380 HP supercharged V6 for the performance-oriented S model.  Diesel engines, while available in other markets, were not available to customers in North America.  

The Sportbrake was introduced for sale in the USA in 2018 where it was positioned as a competitor for other high performance "station wagons." It was initially available only in S trim for North America, with the high performance F-Type 3.0L supercharged 380 HP engine and all wheel drive.  The XF S in sportbrake trim was able to accelerate from 0- in 4.9 seconds.

Chinese and Indian models
A long-wheelbase version debuted at the 2016 Beijing Motor Show, with  added to the wheelbase giving rear passengers  more legroom and  more kneeroom. As the car is designed for chauffeur driven drivers in mind, therefore standard equipment includes folding tables, massaging seats, electric window blinds and eight-inch screens integrated in the back of the front-seat headrests.

It is the first aluminium-bodied car built in China with the debut of some new features, with Clear Exit Detection warning passengers of opening the doors into traffic approaching from behind. The XFL comes with a new cabin air ionisation technology to make the air inside the car more comfortable. For the driver, the InControl Touch Pro infotainment system with its 10.2-inch touchscreen works alongside a configurable 12.3-inch digital instrument cluster which works together with a 17-speaker, 825-watt Meridian Surround Sound System. Rear passengers have access to a wide array of buttons as well as to 2 HDMI ports, 2 USB 3.0 ports, and a 12V power socket.

The 2.0-litre I4 engine is offered in  power output configurations and a  3.0-litre supercharged V6 engine is also offered as the ultimate engine option, with all versions coming with an automatic transmission. The long wheelbase models come with four-wheel-drive only. Due to the long wheelbase and added features, the XFL weighs  more than the standard XF.

On 22 September 2016, the Jaguar XF was launched in India for Rs. 4,750,000 onwards. The engines offered for the Indian market include the 2.0-litre Ingenium petrol and diesel I4 engines. The XF is assembled in India from complete knock-down kits alongside the XE and F-Pace.

Engine specifications

Manual transmission was introduced for the first time in the second generation of Jaguar XF. Previously there was only automatic transmission available.

Figures in square brackets are the specifications of the Jaguar XF Sportbrake.

Safety

References

External links

 

XF (X260)
Executive cars
Mid-size cars
Sports sedans
Rear-wheel-drive vehicles
2010s cars
Cars introduced in 2015
Euro NCAP executive cars
Limousines
Station wagons